Siavash Shams (also known as Siavash Sahne due to his hit song Sahneh) (born 26 January 1963) is an Iranian singer, songwriter, record producer. He rose to fame in 1985 after his songs Sahne ("stage") and Dokhtar Irooni ("Iranian  girl") became hits.  He continued with albums Pedar and Faryad ‘’The Voice’’ . His songs "Yavash Yavash", "Dooset Nadaram", "Chikeh Chikeh", "Beraghs", "Dokhtar Choopoon", "Havar Havar", "Male Mani", "Nagoo Kieh", and "Sahneh" were the biggest hits. He single handedly created a revolution in the Iranian pop industry.

Early life 
After a gap following his single "Dorough", Siavash recorded an upbeat dance song "Mohtaj", in collaboration with songwriter and producer Shahram Kabiri. The song quickly received more than 1.5 million downloads and views and became one of Siavash's most popular songs. He wrote the melody, with lyrics by Kabiri, songwriter and producer. The video was directed by Ramin Kabiri.

Discography

Albums
 Hamsayeha (1985)
 Sahneh (1993)
 Poudmayday Per (1994)
 Pedar (1995)
 Didar (1996) (lyrics by Shahram Kabiri)
 Faryad (1997)
 Fahrten Maymouth (1998)
 The Voice (2001)
 Seven (2009)

Singles
 Gole Man (2010)
 Dorough (2011)
 Nemidoonam (2012)
 Aieet Duuduu (2012)
 Mohtaj (2012) (lyrics by Shahram Kabiri)
 Delbare naz (2012)
 Yek Do Se (2012)
 Nafas (2012)
 Hesse man (2013)
 Khoshhalam (2013) 
 Gerye (2015)
 Oghyanous (2017)
 Ashegham Kardi (2019)
 Ghahveye Ghajar (2021)

References

External links
 
 

1963 births
Living people
People from Ahvaz
Iranian composers
Iranian pop singers
Iranian male singers
Iranian pop musicians
People from San Diego
Artists from San Diego
Caltex Records artists
Taraneh Records artists
Iranian record producers
Persian-language singers
American male pop singers
Iranian singer-songwriters
20th-century Iranian male singers
21st-century Iranian male singers
American people of Iranian descent
Iranian expatriates in the United States